National College may refer to:

India

 National College, Bangalore
 National College, Tiruchirapalli, Tamil Nadu, India
 R. D. National College, Mumbai

Ireland
 National College of Ireland

Mexico
 Colegio Nacional (Mexico) (National College)

Pakistan
 Government National College (Karachi)
National College of Arts, Lahore

Romania
:Category:National Colleges in Romania

United Kingdom
National College Creative Industries, Essex, England
National College for Digital Skills, London, England
 National College for Teaching and Leadership, Nottingham, England

United States
 National American University, formerly known as National College
 National College (Virginia)
 National University of Natural Medicine, formerly known as the National College of Natural Medicine